Pipia is a surname. Notable people with the surname include:

 Agustín Pipia (1660–1730), Spanish Master of the Order of Preachers
 Lasha Pipia (1975–2021), Russian judoka
 Roman Pipia (born 1966), Georgian businessman 
 Vakhtang Pipia (born 1960), Abkhaz politician

Georgian-language surnames
Surnames of Georgian origin
Surnames of Abkhazian origin